The following list includes notable athletes who were born or raised in Chicago, Illinois.

Baseball

Basketball

Boxing

Football

Golf

Gymnastics

Hockey

Ice skating

Martial arts

NASCAR

Rowing and yachting

Soccer

Sports commentators

Swimming

Tennis

Track and field

Volleyball

Wrestling

References

Athletes from Chicago